Courted is a 2015 French drama film directed by Christian Vincent. It was screened in the main competition section of the 72nd Venice International Film Festival where Fabrice Luchini won the Volpi Cup for Best Actor. At the 
41st César Awards, Sidse Babett Knudsen won the César Award for Best Supporting Actress.

Plot 
Michel Racine is a feared president and judge of Assize Court, as strict with himself as with others. Everything changes when he meets Ditte when she's selected as a juror in a criminal trial over which he presides.

Cast
 Fabrice Luchini as Michel Racine
 Sidse Babett Knudsen as Ditte Lorensen-Coteret
 Raphaël Ferret as Lieutenant Massimet
 Miss Ming as Jessica Marton
 Corinne Masiero as Marie-Jeanne Metzer 
 Marie Rivière as Marie-Laure Racine
 Michaël Abiteboul as Lawyer Jourd'hui

Accolades

Reception 

On Rotten Tomatoes, the film has an aggregate score of 91% based on 10 positive and 1 negative critic reviews.

References

External links
 

2015 films
2015 drama films
French drama films
2010s French-language films
Courtroom films
Films featuring a Best Supporting Actress César Award-winning performance
Films directed by Christian Vincent
Gaumont Film Company films
2010s French films